Pingyi County is a county in the south of Shandong Province, China. It is the westernmost county-level division of the prefecture-level city of Linyi. Its special local products are honeysuckle and granite. The second highest mountain in Shandong, Mount Meng, is located in Bianqiao Town.

Administrative divisions
Pingyi County consists of 14 towns and 2 townships.
Towns

Townships
Ziqiu Township
Weizhuang Township

Climate

References

External links
Official website of Pingyi County

Counties of Shandong
Linyi